White Water Canyon is a river rapids ride in the Cedar Fair parks of Canada's Wonderland, Kings Dominion, and Kings Island. The attraction features six seat raft-styled boats. It is the one of the three rides at Canada's Wonderland manufactured by Intamin.

Locations
Canada's Wonderland - Frontier Canada
Kings Dominion - Old Virginia
Kings Island - Rivertown
 Thunder Canyon, similar ride at other Cedar Fair parks

Kings Island
For the 2016 season, White Water Canyon received a new entrance at Kings Island for the construction of Mystic Timbers.

References

External links
 Canada's Wonderland official site - White Water Canyon
 Kings Dominion official site - White Water Canyon
 Kings Island official site - White Water Canyon

Amusement rides introduced in 1984
Amusement rides introduced in 1985
Cedar Fair attractions
1983 establishments in Virginia
1984 establishments in Ontario
1985 establishments in Ohio